88.9 Cap Rhythm (DYCN 88.9 MHz) was an FM station owned and operated by Tagbilaran Broadcasting System. Its studios and transmitter were located in Roxas, Capiz. It carried a Top 40 format during its existence.

References

Radio stations in Capiz
Defunct radio stations in the Philippines